Charles Venn (born 24 June 1973), formerly known by the stage names Chucky Venice and Chucky Venn, is a British actor, known for his roles as Ray Dixon in EastEnders, Jacob Masters in Casualty, Curtis Alexander in Sky One's Dream Team, and Tremaine Gidigbi in Footballers' Wives. He's co-starred with actors such as Michael Jai White, Tom Frederic & Erik Palladino. In 2018 he took part in BBC's Strictly Come Dancing, partnered with Karen Clifton.

Early life
Born in Queens Park, London, he grew up on the tough Mozart estate, which was at the time a notorious inner-London sink estate. As a boy his passion was for athletics. He attended West London College [formerly Ealing, Hammersmith and West London College] studying performing arts.

Career

Venn took a variety of roles as a jobbing actor, using the surname Venice. He got his big break in 2003 when he was cast as Curtis Alexander in the footballing drama Dream Team on the satellite channel Sky One. Initially only contracted to appear in two episodes, he became part of the regular cast, appearing in 98 episodes in all until the character was killed off in 2005.

Venn moved to another football drama the following year, appearing as the cuckolded 'alpha male' Tremaine Gidigbi in the final season of Footballers Wives.

In late 2006, Venn landed a role in the horror film sequel Return to House on Haunted Hill as Warren, he also had a role in 'Wrong Turn 3: Left for Dead' as Walter and a small role in Bourne Ultimatum, as Agent Hammond, and The Dark Knight, as bodyguards of one of the film's main villains, Gambol. He can also be seen in the music video "Twisted" by Fredi Kruga.
Venn guest starred in an episode of the series Little Miss Jocelyn, which aired in January 2008. Venn was also seen on an episode in the third season of Kathy Griffin: My Life on the D-List where Kathy visits the UK and the pair go on a date. His on-screen time lasted just over a minute, and he was subtitled throughout when the episode aired 17 July 2007. Prior to the Hull City-Tottenham Hotspur game on Setanta Sports on 23 February, Venn performed a strange monologue.

He appeared in the play The Brothers by Angie Le Mar at the Hackney Empire for several short runs from 2005. It was televised by MTV Base in March 2009 with Venn, MC Harvey and Jason Barrett in the line-up.

Venn played the lead role in the film A.W.O.L also starring Jade Asha and Rough Copy.

Venn joined the cast of BBC One soap EastEnders in the role of Ray Dixon, the father of Morgan Jackson-King, in November 2011, appearing in the series from 10 January 2012. He departed the show on 28 May 2013. He played a firefighter on the Miranda 2014 Christmas Special: I Do, But to Who?.

On 18 July 2015, Venn made his debut on BBC One's medical drama Casualty as the new nurse Jacob Masters. He later became a series regular.

In January 2018, Venn participated in And They're Off! in aid of Sport Relief.

On 21 August 2018, Venn was announced as the fourteenth celebrity to join the Strictly Come Dancing line up of 2018. He was partnered with professional dancer Karen Clifton and they finished in 6th place.

Partial filmography
The Dark Knight (2008) - Gambol's Bodyguard #1
Wrong Turn 3: Left for Dead (2009) - Walter

Awards and nominations

References

External links

1973 births
Black British male actors
English male film actors
English people of Nigerian descent
English male television actors
Living people
People from Kilburn, London